Nanteuil-en-Vallée is a commune in the Charente department in southwestern France.

Nanteuil-en-Vallée was listed as one of France's "Petite Cité de Caractère' or 'Small Town of Character' in 2016.

Population

See also
Communes of the Charente department

References

Communes of Charente